A network of Brisbane tramways substations, supplied from the Brisbane Powerhouse, were developed by Brisbane City Council after they took over the Brisbane Tramways system from Brisbane Tramways Company (BTCo). The new powerhouse and substations were needed, as BTCo had not adequately invested enough into the electricity network to keep the system running efficiently. Brisbane City Council maintained this electricity network from 1927 until 1969, when the decision was made not to have Trams in Brisbane, and the network was shut down and decommissioned.

Original Brisbane Tramways Company network

Workshops and administration for the electric tram system were initially located in cramped quarters at Countess Street, at the western side of the Roma Street railway yards (now the site of the Roma Street Parkland), but in 1927 were relocated to Milton.  Access to the workshops was from Boomerang Street in Milton, off Milton Road.  Head Office was accessed from Coronation Drive (then known as River Road).

Power for the electric trams was originally drawn from a power station operated by the tramway company adjacent to its Countess Street depot and workshops.  As the tramway company increased both the number of trams and the length of routes, the power supply rapidly became inadequate.  Additional power generating units were installed at Light Street, Fortitude Valley depot and a further powerhouse was built on Logan Road  Woolloongabba, adjacent to the Woolloongabba railway line.  Inadequate power supply was to remain a problem while the tramways remained in private hands.  With the takeover of the system in 1922 by the Brisbane Tramways Trust (and subsequently the City Council) considerable investment was made in many areas including power generation and distribution.  A larger powerhouse was built in New Farm which commenced generation in 1928 and was sufficient for both the needs of the tram system and other consumers.

The original Countess street powerhouse was demolished and material from it was used to construct the new Tramways headquarters.

Brisbane Powerhouse

The original Brisbane Powerhouse, located at New Farm was designed by Tramways Department Architect Roy Rusden Ogg and commissioned by the newly formed Greater Brisbane City Council, went into service as the first council-operated power station built in Brisbane in June 1928.

Tramways substations
The substations were located at strategic points throughout the system. Prior to 1940, their design was the responsibility of BCC Tramways Department architect and construction engineer, Roy Rusden Ogg.  In conjunction with the tramway's chief engineers Nelson and Arundell, he designed  10 Brisbane substations between 1926 and 1936 and the first two stages of the New Farm powerhouse.

Tramways substations (1927-1940) by Roy Ogg 
Ogg designed 8 classic stand alone brick substations, seven of which survive today, all of which are heritage listed. In addition Ogg also designed the Ballow St Control building, which contained Tramway Substation No. 1. Tramway Substation No. 3 was not a brick building, being just a tin shed. Dates in the table below are sourced from Brisbane City Council Archives

Tramways substations (1948-1953) by Frank Costello 
On 24 February 1941, a 38-year-old Sydney-based architect Frank Gibson Costello was appointed as the new City Architect. Costello had a completely different style of substation building, creating a much more utilitarian building, very different to his predecessors. Costello, later became the overall Town Planning and Building Department Manager, when the Town Planner, R.A. McInnes left Council. With the end of the Chandler administration in 1952, Costello himself was fired along with seven other executive officers (including his deputy), C.A. Hamilton on 7 July 1952.

While previously Roy Ogg had been the dedicated Tramways Architect, and the City Architects A.H.Foster and H.A.Erwood had no involvement in the Tramways at all, Costello as City Architect was responsible for all Council buildings. For this reason, Costello designed two of his six substations as joint tramways and electricity department substations. These two sites at Hamilton and Ashgrove saw the cooperation of three departments, with the Parks Department involved with public toilets also attached at these sites (these toilets are no longer publicly accessible). So while none of Oggs' substations are operational, two of Costello's are due to cooperation with the BCC Electricity Department.

Tramways substation design

Considerable attention was given to the design of the substations serving the tramway system. The architecture was marked by the stylistic preferences of the individual architects, the Brisbane City Tramways architect Roy Rusden Ogg and later City Architect Frank Gibson Costello. Although they were robust utility buildings, generally small in scale, elegant proportions and such details as finely crafted brickwork distinguished them.

It is the fine design of the tramway substations which has seen most of them heritage listed. The listing for Brisbane Tramways Substation No.8 (Kedron) meets Criterion E of the Queensland Heritage Act 1992 - that "The place is important because of its aesthetic significance." The listing states that "The former substation contributes to the streetscape, its quality of design and materials enabling the prominently placed building to successfully combine function and a pleasing appearance."

The later substations, designed by Frank Costello have been successfully re-purposed for other uses, with Hamilton and Ashgrove Substations still used by Energex. Coorparoo, Holland Park and Alderley Tramways Substations were built close to other electricity department substations, and so eventually after the demise of the tramways network in 1969, they became redundant with no need for them for general electricity distribution and were eventually sold into private ownership.

The Alderley Tramways Substation has been re-purposed into a residential dwelling.

Holland Park and Alderley Substations are of very similar design with the main frontage having small high set windows above the main entrance, with the side elevations also having small high set windows, with much larger windows down below.

Tramways Substation No.2 (Russell Street)
Tramway Substation No.2 is notable for being the only substation that has been demolished. It was demolished along with the old City Electric Light Company Stanley Street Substation (which was located next to the Ship Inn). Following the demise of the tramway network in 1969, the substation was taken over by the Brisbane City Council electricity department who made use of the substation for local electricity supply to the area. In 1985 the substation site was incorporated into the overall site for Expo 88, when the parkland was extended with almost all properties between Stanley Street, Vulture Street, the railway and Russell Street were demolished and roads also cleared for the site of Expo 88. The site would now be part of South Bank, Queensland.

Photos of the demolition exist, with the substation logo and no still visible. Despite the generally poor utilisation of the old tramway substation sites, they have otherwise survived, and have mostly been heritage listed. Modern heritage protection did not exist in Queensland until 1992, with some limited heritage protection first introduced in the Brisbane City Council 1987 Town Plan

Brisbane City Council has a good collection of photos showing what much of the South Bank site looked like prior to Expo 88. Essentially this previously industrial area had become run down and neglected. The Russell Street Tramways Substation is only shown in one photo.

See also
 Trams in Brisbane
 Brisbane Powerhouse
 Brisbane Tramways Substation No. 5 at Newstead House
 Brisbane Tramways Substation No. 6
 Paddington Tramways Substation No. 7 at Paddington
 Brisbane City Council Tramways Substation No. 8 at Wooloowin
 Brisbane City Council Tramway Substation No 9 at Norman Park

References 

Public transport in Brisbane
Electric power infrastructure in Queensland